Dale Launer (born May 19, 1952) is an American screenwriter, film director and producer, best known for his work in comedy films. His films include Ruthless People, Blind Date, Dirty Rotten Scoundrels and My Cousin Vinny.

Biography
Launer was born in Cleveland, Ohio, and brought up in the San Fernando valley.  He is Jewish. He attended California State University, Northridge, where, after changing his major to Film, he recognised his desire for a job writing and directing films.  His first successful screenplay was Ruthless People (1986).

In May 2007, his film Tom's Nu Heaven, which he produced, wrote and directed, won Best Picture at the Monaco Film Festival.

Launer was friends with the family of murderer Elliot Rodger. At the behest of Rodger's father, Launer attempted to advise Rodger on how to be more confident with women. After Rodger's death, Launer wrote an article for the BBC about his experience.

Filmography
Ruthless People (1986) - writer
Blind Date (1987) - writer
Dirty Rotten Scoundrels (1988) - executive producer, writer
My Cousin Vinny (1992) - producer, writer
Love Potion No. 9 (1992) - producer, director, writer
Tom's Nu Heaven (2005) - producer, director, writer

References

External links
Dale Launer's Official Website

American male screenwriters
1952 births
Living people
Writers from Los Angeles
William Howard Taft Charter High School alumni
Screenwriters from California